Sodalitium is Latin for fellowship or community and may refer to:

 Sodalitium Christianae Vitae
 Sodalitium Pianum